The Buttonball Tree is an exceptionally large American sycamore (Platanus occidentalis) located in Sunderland, Massachusetts.

Though the nickname "buttonball" has been used for all like trees, this tree retained the name, mainly because of its pure size and popularity. It is a remnant of Sunderland's forests. Because of their longevity, during the 17th and 18th century sycamores were sometimes planted at the door of new houses for newlyweds as "bride and groom" trees. Though the age of the tree is unknown, it is estimated to be well over 350 years old, with many estimates saying that the tree is closer to 400. The tree is well known and is one of the larger tourist attractions of the town.

The tree is believed to be the largest tree of its kind on the East Coast, or as locals put it, "The widest tree this side of the Mississippi."

Plaque
There is a plaque set in stone in front of the tree, which was added in 1987, to commemorate the 200th anniversary of the signing of the Constitution, and the tree's age.

Picture gallery

See also
Pinchot Sycamore, an American Sycamore of larger size located in Simsbury, Connecticut
List of individual trees

References

Individual trees in Massachusetts
Individual plane trees
Sunderland, Massachusetts
Roadside attractions in Massachusetts
Tourist attractions in Franklin County, Massachusetts